The 1978 Fresno State Bulldogs football team represented California State University, Fresno as a member of the Pacific Coast Athletic Association (PCAA) during the 1978 NCAA Division I-A football season. Led by first-year head coach Bob Padilla, Fresno State compiled an overall record of 3–8 with a mark of 1–4 in conference play, tying for fifth place in the PCAA. The Bulldogs played their home games at Ratcliffe Stadium on the campus of Fresno City College in Fresno, California.

Schedule

Team players in the NFL
The following were selected in the 1979 NFL Draft.

The following finished their college career in 1978, were not drafted, but played in the NFL.

References

Fresno State
Fresno State Bulldogs football seasons
Fresno State Bulldogs football